Saleh Saleem (born 2 November 1953) is an Israeli Arab former politician who served as a member of the Knesset for Hadash between 1994 and 1999.

Biography
In 1985, he became head of I'billin local council, a position he held until 2008. He was placed fourth on the Hadash list for the 1992 elections, but missed out on a seat as the party won three seats. However, he entered the Knesset on 5 July 1994 as a replacement for the deceased Tawfiq Ziad. After being placed second on the joint Hadash-Balad list, he was re-elected in the 1996 elections and was appointed Deputy Speaker of the Knesset. Prior to the 1999 elections he decided to retire from politics, and was given a symbolic place on the party's list (116th), losing his seat.

References

External links

1953 births
Living people
Arab members of the Knesset
Hadash politicians
Members of the 13th Knesset (1992–1996)
Members of the 14th Knesset (1996–1999)